"Nichts in der Welt" ("Nothing in the World") is a song by Die Ärzte. It is the sixth track on CD2 and the third single from their 2003 album Geräusch. It's about losing the belief in love.

The video 

The video shows the band performing the song live.

Track listing 
 "Nichts in der Welt" (Urlaub) – 3:50
 "Geld (live)" (Felsenheimer) – 4:46
 "Anti-Zombie (live)" (Gonzalez/Gonzalez, Blitz) – 3:29
 "WAMMW MESMAAG (live)" (Urlaub) – 3:53
 "Nichts in der Welt (Video)" (Urlaub) – 3:50

B-sides 

 "Geld" ("Money") is from Runter mit den Spendierhosen, Unsichtbarer!
 "Anti-Zombie" and "WAMMW" are from Geräusch
 "WAMMW MESMAAG" has one verse more than "WAMMW". "WAMMW" is short for "Wenn alle Männer Mädchen wäre" [If all men were girls] and "MESMAAG" is short for "Mit einer Strophe mehr als auf "Geräusch" [With one more verse than on Geräusch].

Charts

2004 singles
Die Ärzte songs
Songs written by Farin Urlaub
2003 songs